Teniente Arturo Parodi Alister Base is a Chilean Antarctic research base located in the claimed Chilean Antarctic Territory. 
It was inaugurated on December 7, 1999, and was located about 1 km from the Patriot Hills Base Camp, operated by the American private company Adventure Network International (now Antarctic Logistics & Expeditions LLC), together with a blue ice aerodrome. After the transfer to the Union glacier of the operations of the company in November 2010, the base was disarmed and transferred to the Union glacier at the end of 2013.
It operated from November to December every two years by the Air Force of Chile with a population of 25 people, but could provide life support to 40 people.

See also
 List of Antarctic research stations
 List of Antarctic field camps

References

Outposts of Antarctica
Antarctic Chilean Territory articles
1999 establishments in Antarctica